This article is a list of former National Football League (NFL) stadiums, their locations, the years of usage, and the teams that played inside the stadiums.

Early era (1920-1940) 

Teams that were not in the NFL while in the stadium or not in the NFL when they left a stadium will not be shown, and if they had the same stadium when they joined the NFL, the joined stadium section will be the year the team joined the NFL.

Merger era (1941-1970) 

Teams from the American Football League (AFL) as well as teams from the All-America Football Conference (AAFC) that removed their stadiums before their merger with the NFL does not count on here and teams that had the same stadium after the merger will be shown to be either in 1950 or in 1970.

Modern era (1971-present)

NFL stadiums used temporarily

References

Defunct National Football League venues
-